Serrata simplex is a species of sea snail, a marine gastropod mollusk in the family Marginellidae, the margin snails.

Description
The length of the shell attains 4.3 mm.

Distribution
This marine species occurs off New Caledonia (depth range 397-400 m.)

References

 Boyer, F. (2008). The genus Serrata Jousseaume, 1875 (Caenogastropoda: Marginellidae) in New Caledonia. in: Héros, V. et al. (Ed.) Tropical Deep-Sea Benthos 25. Mémoires du Muséum national d'Histoire naturelle (1993). 196: 389-436

Marginellidae
Gastropods described in 2008